Nand Gopal Gupta (Nandi), also known as Nandi, Cabinet Minister, Government of Uttar Pradesh for Industrial Development, Export Promotion, NRI, Investment Promotion | MLA Prayagraj (South) | http://nandgopalguptanandi.in

Early life
Gupta hails from Allahabad and was born to Suresh Chandra Gupta. He passed High School in the year 1989 from the Uttar Pradesh board.

Political career
In 2007, Gupta was elected to the Legislative Assembly of Uttar Pradesh from the Allahabad constituency as a candidate of the Bahujan Samaj Party (BSP). In the 2012 assembly elections, he was defeated by Samajwadi Party candidate Haji Parvej Ahmad in the Allahabad South seat. In the national elections of 2014, he sought election to the Lok Sabha as an Indian National Congress candidate from Allahabad but lost. In 2017, he was elected to the Uttar Pradesh assembly from Allahabad constituency for the BJP.

At present he is Cabinet Minister of Minority Affairs, Political Pension and Civil Aviation in the BJP-led Government of Uttar Pradesh.

In July 2020, a First Information Report (FIR) was filed against Gupta alleging that he forcefully had his people paint all the houses saffron along with pictures of Hindu deities in his colony without obtaining the consent of house owners or the residents.

Personal life
Gupta is married to Abhilasha Gupta, who is also a politician. He was seriously injured in a 2010 bomb attack in Allahabad, for which fellow MLA Vijay Mishra is among those who have been charged.

References

Living people
Bharatiya Janata Party politicians from Uttar Pradesh
Bahujan Samaj Party politicians from Uttar Pradesh
Uttar Pradesh MLAs 2007–2012
1970s births
Indian National Congress politicians from Uttar Pradesh
State cabinet ministers of Uttar Pradesh
Yogi ministry
Uttar Pradesh MLAs 2017–2022
Uttar Pradesh MLAs 2022–2027